J.R.S.E.T. College of Law is a private aided law college at Uttar Panchpota in Chakdaha, Nadia, West Bengal. The college is affiliated to University of Kalyani and also approved by the Bar Council of India.

Courses 
The college offers a five-years integrated B.A. LL.B. (Hons.) course, along with three years LL.B course.

Location 
This college is situated at Uttar Panchpota beside the National Highway 34, near Chakdah town of Nadia district. The nearest Railway station is Palpara railway station on Sealdah Ranaghat line.

See also

References

External links 
University of Kalyani
University Grants Commission
National Assessment and Accreditation Council

Law schools in West Bengal
Universities and colleges in Nadia district
Colleges affiliated to University of Kalyani
Educational institutions in India with year of establishment missing